Florence Delaporte (born in 1959) is a French writer and translator.

Works 
1996: Sœur Sourire. Brûlée aux feux de la rampe , Paris, Plon, 244 p. 
1998: Je n’ai pas de château, Paris, Éditions Gallimard, Collection Blanche, 177 p. 
 - Prix Wepler 1998
2001: Le Poisson dans l’arbre, Éditions Gallimard, series "Haute Enfance", 184 p. 
2002: Les enfants qui tombent dans la mer, Éditions Gallimard, Collection Blanche, 271 p. 
2005: La Chambre des machines, Éditions Gallimard Collection Blanche, 152 p. 
2016: Deux livres de chair, François Bourin Éditeur, 282 p.

Children's literature 
2012: À quoi rêve Crusoé ?, Rodez, series "Dacodac", 119 p. 
2013: Amour ennemi, Paris, Éditions Oskar, 133 p.

External links 
 Florence Delaporte on Babelio
 Florence Delaporte on Gallimard
 Florence Delaporte on Les petites fugues
  Florence Delaporte on Ricochet-Jeunes.org

20th-century French women writers
20th-century French novelists
21st-century French novelists
French children's writers
French women children's writers
1959 births
Living people
21st-century French women writers